{{DISPLAYTITLE:Theta1 Microscopii}}

θ1 Microscopii, Latinized as Theta1 Microscopii, is a suspected binary star system in the southern constellation of Microscopium. It is visible to the naked eye was a faint, white-hued point of light with an apparent visual magnitude of 4.82. The distance to this system is approximately 179 light years based on parallax.

The primary is an α2 CVn variable with a period of 2.125 days and a magnitude ranging from 4.77 to 4.87, as well as an Ap star, a chemically peculiar star with strong metallic lines in its spectrum. It is an A-type main-sequence star with a stellar classification of A7VpSrCrEu, where the suffix notation indicates abundance anomalies of strontium, chromium, and europium. The star is 437 million years old with 2.3 times the mass of the Sun and 2.4 times the Sun's radius. It is radiating 36 times the luminosity of the Sun from its photosphere at an effective temperature of 9,240 K.

References

A-type main-sequence stars
Ap stars

Microscopium
Microscopii, Theta1
CD-41 14475
203006
105382
8151
Alpha2 Canum Venaticorum variables